Bromoacetylalprenololmenthane (BAAM or BrAAM) is a β adrenergic receptor agonist.

References 

Acetamides
N-tert-butyl-phenoxypropanolamines
Allyl compounds
Beta-adrenergic agonists
Organobromides
Cyclohexanes